The year 615 BC was a year of the pre-Julian Roman calendar. In the Roman Empire, it was known as year 139 Ab urbe condita . The denomination 615 BC for this year has been used since the early medieval period, when the Anno Domini calendar era became the prevalent method in Europe for naming years.

Events
 The Neo-Babylonian Empire begins attacking Assyrian cities.

Births

Deaths
 Rusa III, king of Urartu (or 590 BC)

References